Edgar Yakovlevich Gess (born 14 March 1954) is a Tajikistani-German football coach and a former Soviet player. He is the current head coach of the FK Andijan football club.

International career
Gess played his only game for the USSR on 5 September 1979 in a friendly game against East Germany. In 2009–2011 he was head coach of Shurtan Guzar. During this time Shurtan Guzar finished 4th in the 2010 season and the team reached the Uzbek Cup final, losing 0–1 to Bunyodkor. On 30 June 2011 he was sacked as a result of the previous losses and Tachmurad Agamuradov was named as the new coach of Shurtan. In July 2012 Gess was appointed as head coach of Shurtan again, after Igor Kriushenko was sacked as well due to a losing record. On 15 May 2013 he was sacked again and left the club permanently. On 10 November 2013 FK Buxoro announced that they had hired Gess as their new manager, replacing Tachmurad Agamuradov in this position.

Personal life
He is a Russian German and emigrated in 1989 to Ulm in Swabia, Germany.

Honours

Player
Soviet Top League winner: 1979.

Manager
Uzbek League 4th: 2010
Uzbek Cup runners-up: 2010

References

1954 births
Living people
People from Sughd Region
Tajikistani emigrants to Germany
Soviet emigrants to Germany
Soviet footballers
Soviet Union international footballers
Russian and Soviet-German people
German football managers
CSKA Pamir Dushanbe players
FC Spartak Moscow players
German expatriate sportspeople in Kazakhstan
Pakhtakor Tashkent FK players
Tajikistani people of German descent
FC Spartak Vladikavkaz managers
Russian Premier League managers
Tajikistani expatriate sportspeople in Kazakhstan
Tajikistani footballers
Soviet Top League players
Association football midfielders